Si salvi chi vuole is a 1980 Italian film. It stars Claudia Cardinale.

Plot

Cast
Gastone Moschin: Stefano		
Claudia Cardinale: Luisa		
Enrico Vecchi: Enrico		
Ilaria Vecchi: Antonella	
Francesco De Rosa: Poldo

References

External links

1980 films
Italian comedy films
1980s Italian-language films
Films directed by Roberto Faenza
Films scored by Ennio Morricone
1980s Italian films